Chris Baldwin  (born October 15, 1975) is an American former professional cyclist. 

He has won the United States National Time Trial Championships on two occasions, in 2003 and 2005. After retiring Baldwin became a cycling coach for TrainingPeaks.

Major results
Source:

1999
 1st Stage 10 Vuelta a Guatemala
2001
 7th GP Stad Vilvoorde
 8th Overall Tour de Beauce
2002
 3rd Time trial, National Road Championships
 9th Route Adélie
 10th Grand Prix Pino Cerami
2003
 1st  Time trial, National Road Championships
 2nd Overall Tour de Beauce
1st Stage 5a
2004
 4th Time trial, National Road Championships
 8th Overall Tour of Qinghai Lake
 10th Overall Tour of Britain
2005
 1st  Time trial, National Road Championships
 5th Rund um Köln
2006
 1st  Overall Tour of the Gila
1st Stage 1
 2nd Time trial, National Road Championships
 9th Overall Tour de Georgia
2007
 2nd Overall Tour of the Gila
2009
 3rd Overall Tour of the Gila
2011
 7th Overall Tour of the Gila
2012
 6th Bucks County Classic
 7th Overall Tour of the Gila

References

External links

American male cyclists
1975 births
Living people
Pan American Games medalists in cycling
Pan American Games silver medalists for the United States
Cyclists at the 2003 Pan American Games
Medalists at the 2003 Pan American Games